José Lorenzo Cossío y Cosío (born Mexico City, 12 May 1902 - died 1975) was a Mexican judge, philatelist and philatelic writer. The collection of his philatelic literature is now in the Museum of Philately of Oaxaca. He collected over six thousand works on Mexican philately and was an expert on philatelic fakes and forgeries.

Legal career

During his legal career he was the Director of Legal Affairs for the PNR.

Selected philatelic publications
The following are publications authored by José Lorenzo Cossío y Cosío.
México Emisión Postal 1874-1883. 1932.
La falsificación de algunos timbres postales antiguos de México. 1932.
Los timbres mexicanos de ocho reales de 1861, negro y café con sobre-carga "APAM". 1935.
Los timbres de tres centavos del Imperio de Maximiliano and the Álbum postal instructivo de la República Mexicana. 1936.
México primera emisión postal para el exterior. 1937.
México álbum postal histórico. 1956.
Sellos usados en las oficinas del correo de la República Mexicana durante los años de 1868 a 1879. 1961.

See also

 List of philatelists
 List of Mexicans

References

External links
Museum of Philately of Oaxaca

1902 births
1975 deaths
Philately of Mexico
Mexican philatelists
Mexican judges